Jack Wodhams (1931 – 2017) was an English-born science fiction writer who lived in Australia from 1955 until his death. He also wrote as Trudy Rose and Caroline Edwards. Wodhams was born on 3 September 1931 in Dagenham, London and died on 3 August 2017.

He was first published in Analog Science Fiction and Fact in 1967 with the story There Is a Crooked Man. He was largely known for the kind of "problem oriented" stories that Analog itself is known for. These stories have been called "generally clever and often ingenious" and good on military matters, but occasionally criticised as facetious. From 1970 to 1982 he was nominated for the Ditmar Award several times.

Bibliography

Novels
 The Authentic Touch (1971)
 Looking for Blucher (1980)
 Ryn (1982)

Short story collection
 Future War (1982)

Prose collection
 The Small Book of Controversies (2003)

Short stories
 "Homespinner" (Galaxy Science Fiction, October 1968)

References

External links

1931 births
2017 deaths
Australian science fiction writers
Australian male short story writers